Andreas Japtok (born 13 September 1960) is a German gymnast. He competed in eight events at the 1984 Summer Olympics.

References

External links
 

1960 births
Living people
German male artistic gymnasts
Olympic gymnasts of West Germany
Gymnasts at the 1984 Summer Olympics
People from Bad Lauterberg
Sportspeople from Lower Saxony